General elections were held in Liberia on 10 October 2017 to elect the President and House of Representatives. No candidate won a majority in the first round of the presidential vote, so the top two finishers — CDC standard-bearer Amb. George Weah and UP standard-bearer Vice President Joseph Boakai — competed in a run-off on 26 December. The second round was originally scheduled for 7 November, but was postponed after LP standard-bearer Cllr. Charles Brumskine, in third place, challenged the result in the Supreme Court. The Supreme Court dismissed the challenge, which would have forced a re-run of the first round had it been successful, and the second round was held on 26 December. Weah emerged victorious with  60% of the vote.

The elections were overseen by the National Elections Commission (NEC) and were the first elections to be run entirely by the Government of Liberia and security forces since the conclusion of the civil wars in 2003.

Electoral system
The President is elected using the two-round system, whilst the 73 members of the House of Representatives are elected by first-past-the-post voting in single-member constituencies.

Candidates
Incumbent President Ellen Johnson Sirleaf, in office since 2006, was constitutionally barred from running for a third term; the election was therefore to choose her successor.

Joseph Boakai, Vice President since January 2006
Charles Brumskine, Leader of the Liberty Party and former President Pro  of the Senate
MacDella Cooper, philanthropist
Alexander B. Cummings, former Executive Vice President and Chief Administrative Officer of Coca-Cola
Prince Yormie Johnson, former rebel leader
Joseph Mills Jones, leader of the Movement for Economic Empowerment and former Governor of the Central Bank of Liberia
Richard Miller, businessman
Benoni Urey, businessman
George Weah, former footballer who was defeated by Ellen Johnson Sirleaf in the 2005 election
MacDonald A. Wento, United People's Party
Jeremiah Whapoe, businessman

Opinion polls

Conduct
The European Union Electoral Observer Mission (EU EOM)'s preliminary statement, issued on 12 October 2017, acknowledged generally peaceful polling. However, "The EU EOM has directly observed several instances of public officials engaged in campaigning that further hampered equality among contestants. The mission has received claims about the uneven use of state resources and access to public spaces working to the advantage of the incumbent. The mission's direct observation indicates a high level of monetisation of the campaign, where a culture of in-kind and financial hand-outs to communities prevails."

Results

President

House of Representatives

References

Liberia
Election, General
Elections in Liberia
Liberia
Liberia
Election and referendum articles with incomplete results